Catherine Dorothea Taylor (4 February 1914 in Birmingham, England – 9 April 1992 in Cape Town) was a South African politician. She was the Member of Parliament for Wynberg, Cape Town until she resigned from the United Party in 1974.

Taylor was a United MP for Wynberg, 1953–74, Shadow Minister of Education 1971-74 and Shadow Secretary for Coloured Affairs 1972–74. She also wrote an autobiography, "If Courage Goes".

She was a daughter of Harold Stephen Sharpe an Anglican priest and archdeacon. She read philosophy, languages, psychology  and history at Bristol University.

Taylor married Lance Gordon Taylor in Cape Town on 5 September 1939. They had three sons.

Works

References

External links
 

1914 births
1992 deaths
United Party (South Africa) politicians
Members of the House of Assembly (South Africa)
20th-century South African women politicians
20th-century South African politicians
British emigrants to South Africa